This is a list of Indian state budgets as enacted by the state legislatures for the upcoming fiscal year.

References

State government finances in India